The Law and the Woman is a lost 1922 American silent drama film directed by Penrhyn Stanlaws and starring Betty Compson. This film is a version of Clyde Fitch's play The Woman in the Case and a remake of a 1916 silent version The Woman in the Case starring Pauline Frederick. Jesse Lasky produced.

Plot
As described in a film magazine, Phil Long (Ferguson) returns from Paris after becoming engaged to the notorious vampire Clara Foster (Ridgely). She had previously ensnared Julian Rolfe (Carleton), who is now happily married to Margaret (Compson). Phil is Julian's ward and, because he is wealthy, Clara is determined to marry him. Phil and Julian quarrel over the matter in Clara's apartment and later Phil is found dead in one of the rooms. Julian is convicted of murder and sentenced to death. By assuming the character of a woman of Clara Foster's type, Margaret secures a confession from Clara, who turns out to be the actual murderer. In dramatic fashion, Julian is saved from execution in the electric chair by just moments.

Cast

References

External links

Fitch, Clyde, The Woman in the Case; a Play in Four Acts, Boston: Little, Brown, and Co., 1915, on the Internet Archive

1922 films
American silent feature films
Paramount Pictures films
American films based on plays
1922 drama films
Silent American drama films
American black-and-white films
Lost American films
1922 lost films
Lost drama films
Films directed by Penrhyn Stanlaws
1920s American films